We Are the Romans is the second and final studio album by American metalcore band Botch. It was originally released in November 1999 through Hydra Head Records. Since its release, it has been seen as an influential album on metalcore and hardcore music.

Recording 
In 1999, Botch recorded some live demos with Matt Bayles for their second studio album and follow up to American Nervoso. Two months later, Botch returned to Litho Studios with Bayles to record what would become We Are the Romans. The group only had approximately one week to track the album, and according to Knudson, the group "[rushed] to get everything done and do it as well as we wanted to." As a last minute addition to the album, Botch rewrote and rerecorded the song "Frequenting Mass Transit"—originally released on a split release with Murder City Devils—and changed the title to "Frequency Ass Bandit".

Composition and lyrics 
The title of the album was derived from the lyrics to the album's closing track "Man the Ramparts". According to Verellen: "Brian [Cook] thought it'd make a great title, but I thought it was a totally silly gladiator song. The riff is kinda huge, so I was thinking about chariots and fire and stuff like that. It sounds like I pulled the words out of Conan the Barbarian. But then we started talking about the social decline of Western civilization, and how Americans are the new Romans—it's all slaves and Caesars. So we made it work." Bassist Brian Cook, who determined many of the song titles, credits J. G. Ballard's book The Atrocity Exhibition as inspiring themes of "the human body as a landscape, and the way that culture and environment sort of dictates the human body and vice versa."

Promotion and release 
We Are the Romans was released in November 1999 through Hydra Head Records on both CD and double LP vinyl formats.

Botch's first show in support of We Are the Romans was the final show for the Seattle venue Rkcndy with The Blood Brothers, Playing Enemy and Kill Sadie in October 1999. The club was an all-ages venue that was being demolished to make way for a hotel. Verellen expressed his admiration for playing all-ages shows stating that, "People go to all-ages shows to see the bands, but people will go to bars... and while they're at the show, they're just hanging out with their friends. That doesn't mean all bar shows are like that, but that's what makes me not want to play bars, basically." In 2000, Botch toured Europe with The Dillinger Escape Plan, and also went on a smaller North American tour later that year. On July 28, 2001, Botch performed at Louisville, Kentucky's hardcore festival Krazy Fest 4, which also featured Coalesce, Converge, Poison the Well and Harkonen among others.

A remastered two disc edition was later released on September 11, 2007. A Hydra Head repressing of the vinyl was released on October 25, 2011. The repress sold out on pre-order in under 20 minutes.

On November 4, 2022, Sargent House will reissue We Are the Romans following the collapse of Hydra Head Records. The reissue notably features the newly written and recorded bonus track "One Twenty Two" .

Reception and legacy 

The album achieved critical acclaim upon release and would become an influential work of music on the mathcore and metalcore movements. Loudwire named the album fifth in its rankings of the 25 best Metalcore albums of all-time and Metal Hammer magazine named it one of the 20 best 1999 metal albums in a 2021 list.

In November 2005, We Are the Romans was inducted into the Decibel magazine Hall of Fame, with Decibel naming it one of the most influential hardcore albums of the 1990s.

"C. Thomas Howell as the 'Soul Man'" has been described by the band as satirizing Racetraitor and "other bands with these very lofty political ideals that seemed like more a marketing tool for the genre of political hardcore rather than a sincere agenda" (Brian Cook).

Track listing 
All songs written and arranged by Botch.

Remaster bonus disc (2007)

Credits 
Writing, performance and production credits are adapted from the album liner notes.

Personnel

Botch 
 Dave Verellen – vocals
 Dave Knudson – guitar
 Brian Cook – bass guitar, backing vocals
 Tim Latona – drums

Additional musicians 
 Sylvia Kehl – vocals on "Man the Ramparts"
 Logic Probe – manipulation, arrangement of "Thank God for Worker Bees"
 DuROC
 Colossus

Production 
 Botch – production
 Matt Bayles – production, recording, mixing
 Ed Brooks – remastering
 Jeff Rigourd – live recording of "Vietmam" and "Hutton's Great Heat Engine"

Visual art 
 Carrie Whitney – photography
 Jason Hellmann – photography (live)
 Dave Knudson – art direction, design
 John Pettibone – lights

Locations

Studios 
 Studio Litho – recording (May 31, 1999 (demos), June 29 – July 8, 1999)
 Avast – mixing (July 11–15, 1999)
 RFI Mastering – remastering (June 5, 2007)

Venues 
 Graceland, Seattle, Washington, US – live recording of "Saint Matthew Returns to the Womb" and "Transitions from Persona to Object"
 unknown venue, Rennes, France – live recording of "Vietmam" and "Hutton's Great Heat Engine"

References

External links 
 

Botch (band) albums
2000 albums
Hydra Head Records albums
Albums produced by Matt Bayles